Jeremy Kauffman (born September 19, 1984) is an American entrepreneur and political activist known for founding and leading LBRY. Kauffman is also known as a vocal supporter and activist within the Free State Project, a movement designed to get 20,000 libertarians to move to the state of New Hampshire.

He was the Libertarian nominee in the 2022 United States Senate election in New Hampshire.

Early life 
Kauffman was born on September 19, 1984 and grew up in Manchester, New Hampshire. He earned two Bachelor of Science degrees in physics and computer science at Rensselaer Polytechnic Institute.

Business career

Jeremy Kauffman was CEO of TopScore prior to formulating the idea for a version of YouTube that would be decentralized in its construction and operation. The result of this idea for a media and video viewing platform that claimed to be fully decentralized was called LBRY (pronounced as "library"). LBRY was launched in 2015. When asked about the purpose of LBRY and Odysee, Kauffman stated that while the LBRY blockchain could be used in a 'Wild West' kind of way, the main goal of the platform was to provide people with choices for content. 

Following an open investigation by the SEC regarding the issuance of a cryptocurrency token called "LBRY credit.", a federal judge in November 2022 ruled that LBC is legally a security that requires regulation by the SEC. Kauffman has not yet commented on whether he intends to appeal the decision or to settle with the SEC but has said the decision "threatens the entire U.S. cryptocurrency industry" by classifying "almost every cryptocurrency" as a security. Upon hearing that Gary Gensler would be the head of the SEC, Kauffman was hopeful that an M.I.T. professor who specialized in cryptocurrency would be fair to the new industry and to not be "a complete sociopath."

Odysee, an open-source video-sharing website that uses the LBRY network, was also founded by Kauffman in 2020. While Kauffman has indicated that he would remove content from the Odysee platform that courts deem to be illegal, he has signaled support for the practice of putting 3D on the website by sharing a 3D gun blueprint file from his personal Twitter account.

Political activity 

In 2018, Kauffman joined the board of directors of the non-profit, the Free State Project. Kauffman believes that the Free State Project is the most effective way for libertarians to achieve "liberty in our lifetimes" and has debated this assertion in a public forum. Kauffman is also a member of the Libertarian Party's Mises Caucus.

In April 2021, Kauffman was given access to Libertarian Party of New Hampshire (LPNH)'s official Twitter account soon after the state party was taken over by the Mises Caucus. Kauffman later made tweets on the LPNH account that received controversy, such as calling for child labor to be legalized, saying "All Republicans do about wokeness is whine. Libertarians have solutions; repeal the Civil Rights Act [of 1964]", and re-opening Gitmo "so that Anthony Fauci and every governor that locked their state down can be sent there, never again to be allowed inside of the United States". The pro-child labor tweet specifically received pushback from 2012 and 2016 Libertarian presidential nominee Gary Johnson, saying "This isn't what libertarianism means to millions of Americans". The tweets later partly resulted in the resignation of the national Libertarian Party leader Joe-Bishop Henchman. Kauffman defended his actions by saying the tweets were good for libertarians, and accused national party leadership of being "woke neoliberal globalists".

At Porcfest 2021, an annual libertarian festival held in New Hampshire,  Executive Director of the Free State Project, Jeremy Kauffman and chair of the Libertarian Party Angela McArdle debated which strategy is more effective. Kauffman argued that, "There are more people in this room that are elected members to the NH House of Representatives and former members of the Libertarian Party than there are Libertarian Party members nationwide." Meanwhile, Angela McArdle argued that while she wants to see the Free State Project succeed, she argues that the Free State Project could not have existed without the political infrastructure provided by the LP developed over the course of five decades.

As of June 2022, Kauffman is running for United States Senate as a Libertarian in New Hampshire. In response to a question as to why he was running for office, he replied, "I'm the only one running that will actually make the government smaller". Among his key campaign issues are "abolishing the Federal Reserve, the Internal Revenue Service and child-labor laws", "making sure the lockdowns and restrictions can't happen again" and committing "to end the drug war". In an NHPR interview, Kauffman stated that he wanted "less democracy," elaborating that he does not want people in California and New York voting on his life in New Hampshire and that it is permissible to "let states disagree" under the U.S. system of federalism.

While some polls initially indicated that Kauffman's run would have a vote splitting effect between Maggie Hassan and Don Bolduc, Hassan beat Bolduc by nearly 10% with Kauffman receiving 2% of the total vote.

Personal life 
Kauffman has three children with his wife Rachel.

See also

 Anarcho-capitalism
 David D. Friedman
 Jason Sorens
 New Hampshire Liberty Alliance
 New Hampshire Liberty Forum
 Porcupine Freedom Festival

References

1984 births
Candidates in the 2022 United States Senate elections
Living people
American company founders
New Hampshire Libertarians